Wilhelm Gülich (June 7, 1895 – April 15, 1960) was a German politician of the Social Democratic Party (SPD) and member of the German Bundestag.

Life 
Gülich was a member of the state parliament in Schleswig-Holstein from 1947 to 1950. There he represented the constituency of Lauenburg/Elbe. From 8 May 1947 to 28 August 1949, Gülich was chairman of the Landtag Committee for Constitution and Rules of Procedure.

From 1949 until his death in 1960, he was a member of the German Bundestag, where he was Deputy Chairman of the Committee for Finance and Taxation from 1953 to 1957.

Literature

References

1895 births
1960 deaths
Members of the Bundestag for Schleswig-Holstein
Members of the Bundestag 1957–1961
Members of the Bundestag 1953–1957
Members of the Bundestag 1949–1953
Members of the Bundestag for the Social Democratic Party of Germany
Members of the Landtag of Schleswig-Holstein